Operclipygus is a genus of hister beetle.

Species
There are 177 species of Operclipygus therefore see:
 List of Operclipygus species

References

Histeridae